Anne Marie Braafheid from Curaçao became the first black woman to attain the position of first runner-up in the Miss Universe 1968 contest. A retired primary school teacher and fluent in five languages, she has been married since the 1970s, has one daughter and still resides in Curaçao.

In popular culture
She had a part in the much-debated 1970 Italian giallo film, Le tue mani sul mio corpo.

External links
 Anne Marie Braafheid Biography (Archived 2009-10-25)

Living people
Curaçao beauty pageant winners
Miss Universe 1968 contestants
Year of birth missing (living people)